The North Shore women's cricket team was the women's representative cricket team for North Shore. They played their home games primarily at Devonport Domain, Devonport. From 1965–66 to 1989–90 they competed in the Hallyburton Johnstone Shield, and won the tournament three times. They were replaced in the competition by North Harbour, who in turn merged with Auckland.

History
North Shore joined the Hallyburton Johnstone Shield in 1965–66, when the tournament was 2-day competition, finishing third out of five teams in their first year of competing. In 1968–69, they won their first title, topping the table with 3 wins from 4 games.

They went on to win the title two more times, two seasons in a row, in 1970–71 and 1971–72, winning three out of four and two out of four, respectively.

North Shore did not win the title again, but were runners-up to Canterbury in every season between 1983–84 and 1988–89. The following season, 1989–90, was their final season in existence, in which they finished fourth out of five. The following season, they were replaced by North Harbour, who eventually merged with Auckland ahead of the 1994–95 season.

Grounds
North Shore's primary home ground throughout their time in existence was Devonport Domain in Devonport, Auckland, which they used from 1968–69 until their dissolution after the 1989–90 season. In the 1973–74 season, they used North Shore, Auckland as their only home ground. They also played various tourist matches at a ground in Stanley Bay, Auckland.

Players

Notable players
Players who played for North Shore and played internationally are listed below, in order of first international appearance (given in brackets):

 Vera Burt (1948)
 Bev Brentnall (1966)
 Jos Burley (1966)
 Judi Doull (1966)
 Jackie Lord (1966)
 Carol Oyler (1966)
 Pat Carrick (1969)
 Liz Allan (1972)
 Elaine White (1972)
 Carol Marett (1972)
 Eileen Badham (1973)
 Sue Rattray (1973)
 Ev Miller (1979)
 Debbie Hockley (1979)
 Karen Plummer (1982)
 Linda Fraser (1982)
 Chris Miller (1982)
 Di Caird (1984)
 Jeanette Dunning (1984)
 Ingrid Jagersma (1984)
 Lois Simpson (1985)
 Katrina Molloy (1985)
 Clare Nicholson (1995)

Honours
 Hallyburton Johnstone Shield:
 Winners (3): 1968–69, 1970–71, 1971–72

See also
 North Harbour women's cricket team
 Auckland Hearts

References

Women's cricket teams in New Zealand
Cricket in Auckland